DeVry University Advantage Academy is a 2-year, dual degree high school located in Chicago, Illinois.  Operated by a partnership with Chicago Public Schools and DeVry University, the program offers students an opportunity to graduate with a high school diploma and an associate degree in either Networking System Administration or Business.  Both high school and college classes are taken at a single location. Until 2019, classes were taken at the original DeVry University Chicago Campus at 3300 N. Campbell Ave.

History 
DeVry Advantage Academy first opened in 2004 by then Chicago Public Schools CEO, Arne Duncan.  The school has graduated 90% of its senior class of 2013 and is one of the few dual-degree high schools in the USA.

References

External links
 

DeVry University
Educational institutions established in 2004
Magnet schools in Illinois
Public high schools in Chicago
2004 establishments in Illinois